Maciel Monteiro may refer to:

 Tomás Antônio Maciel Monteiro, 1st Baron of Itamaracá, Brazilian politician and magistrate
 Antônio Peregrino Maciel Monteiro, 2nd Baron of Itamaracá, Brazilian poet, medician, diplomat and politician
 Wallyson Ricardo Maciel Monteiro, Brazilian soccer player